Noah Wail Sadaoui (born 14 September 1993) is a Moroccan professional footballer who plays as a forward for Indian Super League club Goa.

Club career

Early life and career 
Sadaoui was born in Morocco where he started his career in the youth ranks of Wydad Casablanca, before emigrating to the United States with his parents at age 11 to join the youth team of New York Red Bulls playing in the PDA Academy. Growing up in Bayonne, New Jersey, he attended Saint Benedict's Preparatory School, where he won 2011 Prep Player of the Year and was All-Prep First Team in his junior and senior years. He was leading goal scorer that year with 24 overall, taking his team to the playoffs and the national championship. Following his University-preparatory school career he joined the Saint Peter's College, finishing his first season with the Peacocks with 2011–12 All-MAAC Second Team and All-MAAC Rookie Team honors.

Maccabi Haifa
Sadaoui joined Israeli Premier League side Maccabi Haifa on 7 February 2013 after two seasons at Saint Peter's. Not making his debut in the first team, he was loaned to Hapoel Kfar Saba on a 6-month loan spell for the second half of the 2012–13 Liga Leumit season, making his professional debut in the 2nd tier of professional football in Israel on 15 February 2013 in a 3–0 win against Hapoel Petah Tikva coming on as a 42-minute substitute. The following season saw Sadaoui serving a second loan spell with Hapoel Nazareth Illit for the entire season, parting ways with Maccabi Haifa after the season.

Ajax Cape Town
The Summer of 2014 saw Sadaoui transfer to South African Premier Soccer League side Ajax Cape Town playing under newly appointed manager Roger De Sá. He scored three goals in three matches for Ajax Cape Town, winning the 2015 MTN 8, before parting ways with the club in October.

Miami United FC
Following his season with Ajax CT in South Africa, Sadaoui joined National Premier Soccer League side Miami United F.C., helping the club from Southern Florida to their second league championship, before departing for Honduras, signing with top flight club Real C.D. España.

Real España
Sadaoui joined Real C.D. España in the Summer of 2016. Just days after arriving in Honduras it was announced by head coach Mauro Reyes that Sadaoui would no longer be training with the team, being waived from the squad. He was again free to search for a new club.

Al-Khaburah
On 6 September 2016 it was announced that Sadaoui had joined Al-Khaburah Club from Oman, competing in the Omantel Professional League.

Raja Casablanca
On 5 August 2020 it was announced that Raja Casablanca and Sadaoui had agreed to terms on a 3-year contract.

AS FAR
In 2021 he joined FAR from Rabat, Morocco.

FC GOA
Noah signed for FC Goa in the  Indian Super  League. He scored his first goal for the club against Chennaiyin FC in a 2-0 win. He again scored his second goal against Jamshedpur FC in a 3-0 win.

International career
Sadaoui holds both American and Moroccan passports and was eligible to represent either on international level. He was included in Morocco national football team for the 2020 African Nations Championship. He made his debut for the team in the opening group game against Togo on 18 January 2021, he substituted Zakaria Hadraf in the 80th minute. He started both the semi-final against Cameroon and the final against Mali, as Morocco won the tournament.

Career statistics

Club

International

Honours
Ajax Cape Town
 MTN 8: 2015

Miami United
 NPSL Conference Champions: 2016

Morocco
 African Nations Championship: 2020

Individual
2010 All-Prep First Team
2011 All-Prep First Team
 2011 Prep Player of the Year
 2011–12 All-MAAC Second Team
 2011–12 All-MAAC Rookie team

References

External links

 Noah Sadaoui biography – Saint Peter's College

1993 births
Living people
Footballers from Casablanca
American soccer players
Moroccan footballers
Morocco international footballers
American people of Moroccan descent
American expatriate soccer players
Moroccan expatriate footballers
Maccabi Haifa F.C. players
Hapoel Kfar Saba F.C. players
Hapoel Nof HaGalil F.C. players
Cape Town Spurs F.C. players
Raja CA players
AS FAR (football) players
FC Goa players
Liga Leumit players
Expatriate footballers in Israel
Expatriate footballers in India
Expatriate soccer players in South Africa
American expatriate sportspeople in Israel
Moroccan expatriate sportspeople in Israel
American expatriate sportspeople in South Africa
Moroccan expatriate sportspeople in South Africa
American expatriate sportspeople in Honduras
American expatriate sportspeople in India
Moroccan expatriate sportspeople in Honduras
American expatriate sportspeople in Oman
Moroccan expatriate sportspeople in Oman
Sportspeople from Bayonne, New Jersey
Moroccan expatriate sportspeople in India
St. Benedict's Preparatory School alumni
Sportspeople from Hudson County, New Jersey
Soccer players from New Jersey
Association football midfielders
2020 African Nations Championship players
Morocco A' international footballers
Saint Peter's Peacocks soccer players